Minibraria monroei is a species of sea snail, a marine gastropod mollusk in the family Colubrariidae. It is named after collector Henry H. Monroe.

Description

Distribution
This species is found in the Gulf of Mexico.

References

 Rosenberg, G., F. Moretzsohn, and E. F. García. 2009. Gastropoda (Mollusca) of the Gulf of Mexico, pp. 579–699 in Felder, D.L. and D.K. Camp (eds.), Gulf of Mexico–Origins, Waters, and Biota. Biodiversity. Texas A&M Press, College Station, Texas

External links
 Original description and illustration of Colubraria monroei.

Colubrariidae
Gastropods described in 1962